The 2019 Polish Speedway season was the 2019 season of motorcycle speedway in Poland.

Individual

Polish Individual Speedway Championship
The 2019 Individual Speedway Polish Championship final was held on 14 July at Leszno. Janusz Kołodziej won the Polish Championship for the fourth time.

Golden Helmet
The 2019 Golden Golden Helmet organised by the Polish Motor Union (PZM) was the 2019 event for the league's leading riders. The final was held at Gdańsk on the 11 October. Krzysztof Kasprzak won the Golden Helmet.

Junior Championship
 winner - Jakub Miśkowiak

Silver Helmet
 winner - Dominik Kubera

Bronze Helmet
 winner - Jakub Miśkowiak

Pairs

Polish Pairs Speedway Championship
The 2019 Polish Pairs Speedway Championship was the 2019 edition of the Polish Pairs Speedway Championship. The final was held on 11 May at Bydgoszcz.

Team

Team Speedway Polish Championship
The 2019 Team Speedway Polish Championship was the 2019 edition of the Team Polish Championship. Unia Leszno won the gold medal for the third successive season. The team included Emil Saifutdinov, Janusz Kołodziej, Piotr Pawlicki Jr., Bartosz Smektała and Jarosław Hampel.

Ekstraliga

Play offs

1.Liga

Play offs

2.Liga

Play offs

References

Poland Individual
Poland Team
Speedway
2019 in Polish speedway